Charles Northcott  was an Anglican priest in Ireland during the late  18th century.

Richardson was born in County Tyrone and educated at Trinity College, Dublin. He was Dean of Kilmacduagh from 1719 until his death in 1730.

References

Alumni of Trinity College Dublin
Deans of Kilmacduagh
18th-century Irish Anglican priests
1730 deaths